George Bartholomew may refer to:

 George Bartholomew (inventor), American inventor credited with the invention of concrete pavement
 George A. Bartholomew (1919–2006), American biologist
 George M. Bartholomew (1812–1885), co-founder of Lodi, Wisconsin